Cavaticovelia is a monotypic genus of insects in the order Hemiptera, the true bugs, containing the single species Cavaticovelia aaa. This bug, known commonly as the aaa water treader or lava tube water treader, is a water treader native to Hawaii.

The insect's specific name, aaa, is the Hawaiian word for "lava tube".

References

External links

Gerromorpha genera
Monotypic Hemiptera genera
Insects of Hawaii
Mesovelioidea